Charcot's neurologic triad is the combination of nystagmus, intention tremor, and scanning or staccato speech. This triad is associated with multiple sclerosis, where it was first described; however, it is not considered pathognomonic for it. It is named after Jean-Martin Charcot.

See also
 Charcot's triad

References

Symptoms and signs: Nervous system
Medical triads